Industry Giants is the fifth and final album by alternative rock band Superdrag. It was released in 2009 on Superdrag Sound Laboratories. The album was the band's first album since their 2003 hiatus and reformation with the original lineup in 2007. It also marked the first writing credits and lead vocals on a Superdrag LP by guitarist Brandon Fisher ("Ready to Go") and bassist Tom Pappas ("Cheap Poltergeists," "You're Alive," "4 On The Floor").

Track listing 
All songs written by John Davis, except where noted.
 "Slow to Anger" - 3:02
 "Live and Breathe" - 4:34
 "I Only Want a Place I Can Stay" - 4:19
 "Everything'll Be Made Right" - 4:49
 "Cheap Poltergeists" (Tom Pappas) - 3:40
 "Try" - 5:14
 "Ready to Go" (Brandon Fisher) - 3:34
 "Filthy and Afraid" - 3:36
 "You're Alive" (Pappas) - 2:49
 "5 Minutes Ahead of the Chaos" - 2:04
 "Aspartame" - 3:46
 "Deathblow to Your Pride" - 4:22
 "4 On The Floor" (Pappas) - 3:43 (Amazon.com bonus track)
 "Filter Out the Air" - 3:59  (iTunes bonus track)

Cover art
The ant on the back cover is lifting Indianapolis's Salesforce Tower. Salesforce Tower (formerly Bank One Tower and Chase Tower) is the tallest building in Indiana.

Superdrag albums
2009 albums